This is an overall list of statistics and records of the Bangladesh Premier League, a Twenty20 cricket franchise based tournament which is held in Bangladesh annually.

Team records

Overall Team performance
Records include all matches played under the name of a franchise, even where the franchise has been suspended and re-created as a new organisation.

Note:

 Tie&W and Tie&L indicates matches tied and then won or lost by "Super Over"
 The win percentage excludes no results.

Overall team standings

Highest total overall

Lowest total overall

Highest successful run chases

Largest victories

Largest Victories (by runs)

Largest Victories (by wickets)

Smallest victories

Smallest victories (by runs)

Smallest Victories (by wickets)

Batting records

Most runs

Most runs in a season

Highest individual score

Most sixes

Most sixes in an innings

Best strike rates

Partnership records

Highest partnership by wickets

Highest partnership by runs

Bowling records

Most wickets

Most wickets in a season

Best bowling figures in an innings

Best economy rate

Best average

Best strike rate

Most runs conceded in an innings

Hat-tricks

Wicket-keeping records

Most dismissals

Most dismissals in a season

Most dismissals in an innings

Fielding records

Most catches

Most catches in a season

Most catches in an innings

Miscellaneous records

Awards

Orange cap 

Note: Orange cap winners are the players with most runs in a season

Purple cap 

Note: Purple cap winners are the players with most wickets in a season

Maximum sixes award

Player of the match (final) and series

Notes

References 

Bangladesh Premier League lists
Lists of Bangladesh cricket records and statistics